The following is a partial list of biking trails in Wisconsin:

Northeastern Wisconsin
Calumet County Park (Stockbridge)
Fox River State Recreational Trail — 
Friendship State Trail — 
Devil's River State Trail — Denmark to Rockwood 
Duck Creek Trail — Seymour to Village of Oneida 
Hartman Creek State Park —  of trails
High Cliff State Park — 
Mascoutin Valley State Trail — 
Mountain Bay State Trail — Green Bay to Wausau 
Newport State Park — 
Newton Blackmour State Trail  — Seymour to New London 
Peninsula State Park — 
Point Beach State Forest — 
Potawatomi State Park — 
Tomorrow River State Trail — 
Wiouwash State Trail —

Northern and Northwestern Wisconsin
Bearskin State Trail —  between Minocqua and Tomahawk (website)
Black River State Forest —  of trails near Black River Falls, Wisconsin
Brule River State Forest —  near Brule, Wisconsin
Buffalo River State Trail — 
Copper Falls State Park —  near Morse, Wisconsin
Eau Claire River Trail — 
Flambeau River State Forest —  near Winter, Wisconsin
Gandy Dancer State Trail — 
Lake Wissota State Park —  near Chippewa Falls, Wisconsin
Nine Mile County Forest — 
Northern Highland-American Legion State Forest — 
Old Abe State Trail —  near Chippewa Falls, Wisconsin
Pine Line Trail —  between Medford and Prentice
Saunders State Trail]] — 
Three Eagle Trail —  linking Three Lakes, Wisconsin and Eagle River, Wisconsin (website)
Tuscobia State Trail —  
Wild Rivers State Trail — 
WinMan Trails —  four miles north of Manitowish Waters, WI

South central Wisconsin
Badger State Trail — 
Blue Mound State Park —  of single-track trails and expanding
Capital City State Trail —  of asphalt trails in and around Madison, with connections to the Military Ridge State Trail and the Badger State Trail.
Devil's Lake State Park — 
Mirror Lake State Park — 
Sugar River State Trail —  between New Glarus and Brodhead
Wild Goose Trail —  from Fond du Lac to Clyman Junction

Southeastern Wisconsin
 Alpha Mountain Bike Trail — Milwaukee County Parks' first official mountain bike trail. Located near the old Crystal Ridge Ski Hill, now called The Rock Sports Complex in Franklin, Wisconsin, it is a  trail operated in cooperation with the Metro Mountain Bikers.
 Burlington-Kansasville State Trail — Proposed trail currently under development between Burlington and Kansasville. 
 Hoyt Park —  just east of downtown Wauwatosa on 92nd street.
 Glacial Drumlin State Trail —  from Cottage Grove to Waukesha
 Kettle Moraine State Forest, Northern Unit —  of trails
Kettle Moraine State Forest, Southern Unit — 
 Connector Trail: This trail connects both Emma Carlin and John Muir; it is a technical, two-way trail, so caution is advised.
 Lapham Peak Unit, Kettle Moraine State Forest —  of mixed use trail
 Emma Carlin: short, mild hills; does connect with John Muir
 John Muir: has good technical areas; very hilly on certain paths; does connect with Emma Carlin
 Kohler-Andrae State Park — 
 Oak Leaf Trail — A paved multi-use trail which encircles Milwaukee County.
 Old Plank Road Trail —  from Sheboygan to Greenbush
 Ozaukee Interurban Trail — Mostly railroad bed, running the length of  Ozaukee county. 
 Richard Bong State Recreation Area — 
 White River State Trail — Converted railroad bed between Elkhorn and Burlington. 
 Bug Line Trail

Southwestern Wisconsin

400 State Trail — Railroad bed between Elroy and Reedsburg. 
Belmont Mound State Park —  of trails
Browntown-Cadiz Springs State Recreation Area — 
Elroy-Sparta State Trail — Railroad bed with tunnels. .
Governor Dodge State Park — 
Great River Trail — 
Military Ridge State Trail — Near Dodgeville. Two segments totalling 
Omaha Trail — Railroad bed with tunnels, runs from Camp Douglas to Elroy. 
Perrot State Park — 
Wyalusing State Park — 
 Yellowstone Lake State Park —

See also
Wisconsin Off Road Series

References

External links
Wisconsin State Park System State Trails from the Wisconsin Department of Natural Resources
Maps and information about bike trails in northern Wisconsin - Price, Lincoln, and Vilas Counties

Bike paths in Wisconsin
Bike trails
Wisconsin